Bustin' Loose is an American sitcom starring Jimmie Walker based on the 1981 film of the same name. The show ran in first-run syndication from September 19, 1987, to May 28, 1988.

Synopsis
Jimmie Walker stars as Sonny Barnes, a former con artist, who has been caught by the authorities and sentenced to five years of community service. He is placed in the home of social worker Mimi Shaw (Vonetta McGee), who lives with four orphans: Rudey (Larry O. Williams, Jr.), Trish (Tyren Perry), Nikky (Aaron Lohr), and Sue Anne (Marie Cole). Sonny lives in the basement and works around the house doing odd jobs. Meanwhile, the kids all love listening to Sonny's often exaggerated tales.

Cast
Jimmie Walker – Sonny Barnes 
Vonetta McGee – Mimi Shaw 
Aaron Lohr – Nikky Robinson 
Tyren Perry – Trish 
Marie Cole – Sus Ann Taylor 
Larry O. Williams, Jr. – Rudey Butler

Episode list

Award nominations

Stations

References

External links
 

1987 American television series debuts
1988 American television series endings
1980s American sitcoms
1980s American black sitcoms
English-language television shows
First-run syndicated television programs in the United States
Live action television shows based on films
Television series by Universal Television
Television shows set in Philadelphia